Uruk was a city in ancient Sumer.

Uruk may also refer to:
 Uruk period, the archaeological culture or time period 
 Uruk-hai, the fictional creatures from J. R. R. Tolkien's writings
 Uruk Sulcus, terrain on Ganymede
 UrukDroid, Android distribution for Archos GEN8 devices
 Uruk GNU/Linux, Linux distribution based on Linux-libre

See also
Erech (disambiguation)
Oruk
Urok (disambiguation)